Lhatu Dhura is a mountain of the Garhwal Himalaya in Uttarakhand, India. It is situated in the eastern rim of the Nanda Devi Sanctuary, on the watershed of the Milam Glacier and the Nanda Devi basin. It is joint 103rd highest mountain located entirely within Uttrakhand (Nanda Devi is the highest mountain). It lies 4.6 km south of Sakram . Its nearest higher neighbor Nanda Devi East lies 4.5 km to the south west, and Deo Damla lies 7.7 km to the north; it is 6.1 km east-north-east of Nanda Devi, and 9.5 km south of Mangraon.

Neighboring and subsidiary peaks
Neighboring or subsidiary peaks of Lhatu Dhura:
 Nanda Devi: 
 Rishi Pahar: 
 Lohar Deo: 
 Sakram 
 Rishi Kot: 
 Changabang: 
 Kalanka: 
 Saf Minal:

Glaciers and rivers
Lhatu Dhura stands at the head of the western side of Timphu Glacier and between Timphu glacier and Pachhu Glacier. Both the glacier flows down from west to east and the streams emerges from these glacier Timphu Gad and Pachhu Gad joins Goriganga River. Goriganga River emerges from the snout of Milam glacier  that later joins the Kali River at Jauljibi. On the western side Uttari Nanda Devi Glacier flows down north and joins Uttari Rishi Glacier from the snout of Uttari Rishi Glacier emerges Rish Ganga. Rishi Ganga met with Dhauliganga River near Rini. Later Dhauli ganga met with Alaknanda at Vishnuprayag. Alaknanda River is one of the main tributaries of river Ganga that later joins Bhagirathi River the other main tributaries of river Ganga at Devprayag and became Ganga there after.

See also

 List of Himalayan peaks of Uttarakhand

References

Mountains of Uttarakhand
Six-thousanders of the Himalayas
Geography of Chamoli district